Carpi Cathedral is a Roman Catholic cathedral in Carpi, Emilia-Romagna, Italy, dedicated to the Assumption of the Virgin Mary. It is the episcopal seat of the Diocese of Carpi. It stands on the site of a mediaeval pieve dedicated to Mary; construction on the present building began in 1514, predating the establishment of the diocese here in 1779 by over 250 years.

It was granted the status of a minor basilica in 1979, on the occasion of the bicentenary of the establishment of the diocese.

References

External links

Roman Catholic cathedrals in Italy
Cathedral
Cathedrals in Emilia-Romagna
16th-century Roman Catholic church buildings in Italy